Smithatris is a genus of the ginger family (Zingiberaceae). The first species of this genus, Smithatris supraneanae, was named in 1998 by Kress and Larsen, two researchers from Denmark, in the limestone hills of  Saraburi Province, Thailand. The genus was thought to be monospecific until a second species, Smithatris myanmarensis, was discovered later in Myanmar.

The genus was named after the Scottish botanist Rosemary M. Smith due to her extensive contributions to discoveries and reclassifications in the Zingiberaceae family.

References

Zingiberoideae
Zingiberaceae genera